Alexei Nasedkin (December 20, 1942 in Moscow – December 4, 2014 in Moscow) was a Russian pianist and composer.

Nasedkin showed a talent for music at a young age, composing an opera at age 7, The Tale of the Fisherman and the Fish (Сказке о рыбаке и рыбке), and performing in public at age 9.   He attended the Central Music School in Moscow from 1949 to 1961, where his teachers included Anna Artobolevskaya.  From 1961 to 1966, he studied at the Moscow Conservatory, where his piano teachers included Heinrich Neuhaus and Lev Naumov.  He was also a composition student of Sergei Balasanyan at the conservatory.  He was a sixth-prize winner at the 1962 International Tchaikovsky Competition, and a third-prize winner at the 1966 Leeds Piano Competition.

A recipient of the People's Artist of the Russian Federation title, Nasedkin was the president of Russia's Schubert Society.  He was a member of the Composers' Union of the USSR/RF and a professor at Moscow's Conservatory, where he taught from 1966.

References 

1942 births
Russian classical pianists
Male classical pianists
Prize-winners of the Leeds International Pianoforte Competition
Moscow Conservatory alumni
2014 deaths
20th-century classical pianists
20th-century Russian male musicians